A by-election was held in the Dáil Éireann Kildare North constituency in Ireland on Friday, 11 March 2005. It followed the resignation of Fianna Fáil Teachta Dála (TD) Charlie McCreevy on 31 October 2004 to take up his new position as Ireland's European Commissioner.

On 15 February 2005 the campaign began in earnest when it was announced that polling would take place on 11 March 2005. Eight candidates contested the vacant seat, with victory going to the Independent candidate, Catherine Murphy. Her 23.6% share of the first-preference vote was the lowest recorded at any by-election since Patrick Kinane won the Tipperary by-election in October 1947 with a 21.4% share.

As a result of her election, Kildare North was the only constituency in the Republic of Ireland that did not have a TD from one of the government parties of Fianna Fáil or the Progressive Democrats. Murphy also went into the record books as Kildare North's first ever female member of Dáil Éireann.

On the same day, a by-election took place in Meath, both were the final occasions which the Progressive Democrats contested by-elections.

Result

See also
List of Dáil by-elections
Dáil constituencies

References

2005 in Irish politics
2005 elections in the Republic of Ireland
29th Dáil
By-elections in the Republic of Ireland
Elections in County Kildare
March 2005 events in Europe